The 1963 South Dakota State Jackrabbits football team was an American football team that represented South Dakota State University in the North Central Conference (NCC) during the 1963 NCAA College Division football season. In its 17th season under head coach Ralph Ginn, the team compiled a 9–1 record, won the NCC championship, and outscored opponents by a total of 278 to 166. 

The team's statistical leaders included Gale Douglas with 621 rushing yards and quarterback Ron Meyer with 1,091 passing yards. Halfback Wayne Rasmussen was selected as the NCC's Most Valuable Players. Other key players included ends Darrel Tramp and Ed Maras, tackle Dave Westbrock, center Jerry Ochs, and halfback Wayne Rasmussen.

Schedule

References

South Dakota State
South Dakota State Jackrabbits football seasons
North Central Conference football champion seasons
South Dakota State Jackrabbits football